Cursed is a 2005 American horror comedy film directed by Wes Craven and written by Kevin Williamson, who both collaborated on the Scream film series. The film stars Christina Ricci and Jesse Eisenberg as two orphaned siblings attacked by a werewolf loose in Los Angeles.

Originally planned for 2003, the film took over two more years to be made than originally planned, during which producers Bob and Harvey Weinstein kept asking for reshoots and changes to the plot, re-edited the movie to give a PG-13 rating rather than the original intended R-rating, and fired veteran makeup artist Rick Baker to replace the werewolves he had created with computer-generated ones. Cursed was released theatrically in the United States on February 25, 2005, by Miramax Films. The film was a box-office bomb and received generally negative reviews from critics; Craven himself was very displeased with the final result.

Plot
On a seaside pier in Los Angeles, friends Jenny Tate and Becky Morton decide to get their fortune told by Zela. Zela foretells that they will suffer a horrible fate warning about a beast that feeds off the moon but they don't believe her. That same night, 16-year-old high-schooler Jimmy Myers is picked up on Mulholland Drive by his older sister Ellie, who has just returned from visiting her boyfriend, Jake Taylor. Jimmy had a run-in with some bullies and his crush, Brooke.

Driving home, Jimmy and Ellie collide with an animal and another car. They attempt to rescue the other driver, Becky, but an unseen creature slashes the siblings before it drags Becky off and rips her in half. When interviewed by police, despite Jimmy's belief that it was a wolf or dog-type animal, the official report credits it to a bear or cougar.

The next day at work, Ellie finds herself attracted to the scent of a coworkers blood, but she dismisses it. At a party, Jenny interrupts a conversation between Ellie and Jake. Annoyed that Jenny is flirting with Jake, Ellie leaves the party early. Soon after this Jenny heads down to the parking garage where she is chased and killed by a wolf-like creature. Jimmy does research about wolves in California and starts to believe that the creature was a werewolf, sharing his thoughts with a disbelieving Ellie. To ease Jimmy's concerns, she touches a silver picture frame without getting burned.

Jimmy is becoming much stronger and more aggressive, as shown when a bully named Bo coerces him to join the wrestling team. He easily defeats three wrestlers, including Bo, and calls Bo out for constantly making gay jokes towards him, saying that Bo himself is repressing his own homosexuality.

Ellie starts to believe the werewolf hypothesis when she meets Zela. Zela warns about the effect the coming full moon will have and tells her that the only way to cure herself is to end the line of the werewolf who cursed her. Jimmy proves they have been cursed when he holds a silver cake server and gets burned, discovering that the picture frame Ellie touched earlier was only stainless steel. The siblings dog Zipper, who has become increasingly afraid of his owners, bites Jimmy, becoming infected with the curse, and goes on a rampage. Realizing what's happening, Jimmy goes to warn Ellie with Bo, who showed up at their house to confess that he is gay and has feelings for Jimmy. Bo is flatly rejected by Jimmy who believes the attraction to be his werewolf pheromones, but Bo still helps Jimmy.

Ellie has deduced that Jake is a werewolf and he confirms it. However, he reveals that he didn't attack her and Jimmy as he was born a werewolf and can control his transformations. When another werewolf attacks the two, Bo and Jimmy try to help, but Bo is knocked out. The werewolf turns back into Joanie, who was cursed after a one-night stand with Jake and committed all of the previous murders. She now wants to kill all potential rivals so Jake will be hers.

When Jake offers to let Joanie kill him to protect Ellie, she refuses as she knows killing him would break her curse. After knocking him out she turns into her werewolf form and starts attacking Ellie and Jimmy. The siblings fight her, and when the police arrive, the two draw her out by insulting her. The police open fire eventually killing her when a policeman shoots her in the head. Bo is okay, but Jake has disappeared.

Jimmy and Ellie return to a wrecked home. As Jimmy works to restore the power, Jimmy and Ellie begin transforming. Jake arrives, revealing that as he caused Joanie's curse, the only way to cure Ellie is to kill him. He wants to be with her, but also kill Jimmy so only he is the alpha male. She and Jake fight, but he dominates the fight. Werewolf Jimmy joins in, climbing across the ceiling and biting Jake, allowing Ellie to stab and badly injure Jake with the silver cake server. Ellie decapitates Jake with a shovel and breaks the curse on the two siblings (and Zipper). They watch as Jake's body bursts into flames.

Bo, Brooke, and Zipper arrive at the house. Bo and Jimmy are now friends; Jimmy kisses Brooke and walks her home along with Bo. Ellie is stuck with the clean-up of the messy house.

Cast

Production

Development
The first draft of the script was written by Kevin Williamson in August 2000 and followed the exploits of a New York City serial killer who discovers that his lethal tendencies are due to his lycanthrope nature.
Both screenwriters Sean Hood and Tony Gayton did rewrites of Williamson’s original script during the development process.
Dimension Films co-founder Bob Weinstein announced in October 2002 that Cursed would "reinvent the werewolf genre," and Wes Craven would direct, with the movie being officially released on August 8, 2003. Craven was in the final stages of pre-production with the movie Pulse when Weinstein abruptly pulled the movie from the schedule ten days before shooting and cut through all the slow lanes, getting Cursed off and running. Craven was reportedly not pleased so Weinstein doubled his pay in order for him to do the werewolf film. The director deemed the script too tonally similar to his film Vampire in Brooklyn, but felt pressured by the studio, leading him to ultimately sign on.
"Wes and Kevin are a dynamic team, and we are confident that their collaboration will prove to be a winner," Weinstein stated.
In December 2002, a press release for the project described Cursed as a "modern, hip twist on the classic werewolf tale" and Dimension Films also announced that Academy Award winner makeup effects designer Rick Baker would be in charge of the overall design of the werewolves. Baker had originally turned down the offer due to the very limited time he had to create all the designs and eventually accepted at the only condition to be able to work without any studio interference.

Casting

The first of the three leads to be cast was 19-year-old Jesse Eisenberg, star of the critically acclaimed indie Roger Dodger, who was announced on March 3, 2003. It was also reported that 
Kristina Anapau and Judy Greer had joined the cast in supporting roles.

On March 13, 2003, it was reported that Christina Ricci had signed on to play the leading role of Ellie Harper, an associate producer on The Late Late Show with Craig Kilborn who is attacked by a werewolf after a car accident on Mulholland Drive. The same day, Scott Foley and Omar Epps were also cast as Ellie’s boyfriend Kyle and the chief of the animal control department Ben Taft, respectively.

On March 17, 2003, Skeet Ulrich (who has previously starred in Craven’s Scream as Billy Loomis) joined the cast as Vince Winston, the burnout son of a millionaire who gets bitten and cursed by the beast. Other cast members included Milo Ventimiglia (Bo, a high school bully), James Brolin (Tyler Winston, Vince’s billionaire and estranged father), Shannon Elizabeth (Becky Morton, a party girl who gets brutally murdered under Santa Monica Pier), Illeana Douglas (Zela, an atypical fortune teller) and Robert Forster (Detective Harzel). Scott Baio himself along with Corey Feldman were cast as themselves.
Pop singer and actress Mandy Moore was cast as Jenny Taylor, the opening victim who gets killed by the werewolf during a costume party sponsored by PETA. A Nightmare on Elm Street star Heather Langenkamp joined the cast in a small, supporting role as a TV reporter and John C. McGinley took part in the production as Jimmy's abusive dad. James Kallahan and Michelle Krusiec rounded out the main cast as Ellie’s co-workers Mark and Debbie.

When production shut down and resumed with a new script, new roles were added and others were re-written. Skeet Ulrich was unsatisfied with his character’s transformation and chose to drop out of the film. 
On December 1, 2003, Joshua Jackson was cast as the new male lead (renamed Jack and retooled as Ellie’s boyfriend), along with Portia De Rossi (who replaced Illeana Douglas as Zela), Smallville regular Michael Rosenbaum (taking over James Callahan as Ellie’s assistant, now named Kyle) and R&B singer Mýa as Jenny, previously played by Mandy Moore.
Lance Bass of *NSYNC joined the cast in a cameo appearance as himself.
Scott Foley was originally supposed to reprise the role of Kyle (now turned into Ellie’s assistant) but ultimately dropped out as well.
James Brolin, Robert Forster, Corey Feldman, Omar Epps, Heather Langenkamp and John C. McGinley were all written out from the new version of the script and couldn’t reprise their roles.

Filming
Principal photography was supposed to start on January 27, in order to meet the already-locked August 8, 2003 release date, but delays in pre-production forced Dimension Films to push the start date back to mid March. On late January, a new release date was therefore announced and set on February 4, 2004.

With a budget of $35 million, Cursed commenced shooting on March 17, 2003 in Los Angeles, on a scheduled 15-weeks shoot. 
The set used for the high school is Torrance High School, the same used for Sunnydale High on Buffy the Vampire Slayer, and West Beverly High on Beverly Hills, 90210 and its spin-off 90210. Filming also occurred at Verdugo Hills High School for the scenes involving Jimmy Myers, Jesse Eisenberg’s character Mandy Moore’s opening scene was shot over a 2-night period on the roof of The Bel Age Hotel in Hollywood. Singer Sheila E. appeared in this scene as herself, playing with her band at the costume ball for PETA. The car accident was shot on Mulholland Drive and some interiors were built inside the L.A. Center Studios. More scenes were filmed at the Santa Monica Pier and in Hollywood Boulevard.
Entertainment Tonight did interviews with Ulrich and Ricci when original version was being filmed, and their report included behind the scenes footage of some scenes from it, like Ulrich's character Vince walking near the pier at night, another scene in same location showing him jumping down on beach and landing on all fours, scene where he and Ricci's character Ellie are running out of her house and another scene after that one where they jump down to the streets which based on the original script, was the beginning of the scene where werewolf chases after them but they get to Vince's limousine and ultimately manage to escape.

In early June 2003, after 54 days of filming and with only about six days left to shoot the final confrontation at the Hollywood Wax Museum, Dimension Films decided to put the movie on hold because top executives at the company weren't happy with the film's ending or how the special effects were progressing, specifically the look of the film's lead lupine.

Rick Baker was preparing the final transformation effects when production stopped and asked Weinstein to let his team finish the work in order for it to be ready for the reshoot.
"We were doing some really cool transformation stuff [but] it wasn’t quite done so I said, ‘Listen, if you ever think the film’s gonna pick up again, if you can keep a number of my people on for another month we can have this transformation stuff, wel’ll put it in a box and we’ll be ready to go. If they disperse now it’s gonna be like starting again because I need to have the same people." Weinstein eventually refused.

Editor Patrick Lussier, a frequent collaborator of Craven, had just finished working on re-shoots of Darkness Falls when he was brought in to work on Cursed, which was nearing the end of its principal photography. According to Lussier, the unfinished original version of the film ran about 90 minutes long, and the only thing it was missing, besides the ending, was the score and all the visual effects. 
The movie was put back into a development phase during which all parties discussed on the final outcome. Several options were considered, including shooting the final confrontation as it was originally written or transform the script into something different, saving as much filmed footage as possible. One alternative was to turn the characters of Jesse Eisenberg and John C. McGinley into werewolf hunters.
Ultimately, the originally screenplay went under a major rewrite that turned Ellie and Jimmy into estranged siblings and morphed Vince into Ellie’s mysterious boyfriend Jake. From those 90 minutes, the new version only included about 12 minutes of the original footage.

After a tentative September restart, the movie officially went back into production on November 17, 2003. "Quite an extraordinary amount of new material is going to be shot, and a lot of material is going to be thrown away," Craven said at the time. Rick Baker, who had created the original werewolf design, left the project because of scheduling conflicts and KNB EFX Group came on board to oversee all the new makeup effects.
The exteriors for Jake’s new club Tinsel were shot in Vine Street, next to The Capitol Records Tower, Hollywood and Jimmy and Ellie’s house was built on the Universal Studios backlot.
In the film, Ellie works among the crew of The Late Late Show with Craig Kilborn, with Kilborn making a cameo appearance and Scott Baio, as himself, being booked to appear on the show. Kilborn left the show a few months after shooting wrapped, in August 2004, before the film’s release, and was replaced by Craig Ferguson.

On January 17, 2004, the extensive reshoot wrapped. The new ending of the film was much more emotional and tragic, and featured Jackson's character begging his girlfriend Ellie to kill him to end the curse. An article about the film in Fangoria #241 included pictures of a head prop for Jake's original death scene. From all versions of the film which were test screened to audiences (excluding the original version, which was never test screened), this one scored the highest, but Dimension Films was dissatisfied with it and demanded a new one. Actor Jesse Eisenberg, who, along with Christina Ricci, was one of the few actors to work in all the different versions, stated: “The crazy part is that after we filmed the whole second version of the film, we had to go back for a third re-shoot which lasted about 20 days. That's like the length of an independent movie. And then we had to go back a fourth time for like 10 days and they made shirts that said Cursed 4: Back for More."
The new ending depicted Jake as the main villain, willing to kill both Ellie and Jimmy.
According to Patrick Lussier, the final budget for the film was close to $90–100 million. In the final round of reshoots, werewolf actor Derek Mears improvised the infamous shot of the werewolf flipping off Ellie and Jimmy during rehearsal with Craven. Scott Nimerfro was at one point brought in during reshoots to script new scenes, including an opening sequence of the werewolf jumping through the Hollywood sign that was scrapped due to budget limits. In 2014, Judy Greer spoke of the film in an interview: "I don't know why that movie got so fucked up. I don't understand it. I thought the script was fine. Honest to god, I didn't get the big deal. I don't know who kept making them fuck with it. Then we shot the movie for, like, seven years. I think they said we had four movies worth of footage. It was so fun, but so weird. I don't get it. I couldn't figure it out." In 2018, Christina Ricci also spoke briefly about the film in an interview: "It was one of those studio movies that just got horribly screwed up." In 2019, Jesse Eisenberg gave his thoughts about the troubled production and the film: "The first movie was more interesting and provocative. I don't know why it wasn't working. Now that we know the behind-the-scenes of the Weinstein company, it makes sense as to why it was so chaotic." About the troubled production he said: "They filmed 90% of the bigger budget version… the first movie was this very splashy thing. The second version was definitely cutting corners in a lot of different ways. And the plot? I thought it was so stupid. I thought the plot was so cliché. They made us brother and sister? The things that they kept [from the original film] were little snippets. Like a car rolling down a hill. They kept that shot."

Post-production
Editor Patrick Lussier was supposed to work on the film for only six weeks in summer 2003, but ended up working on it for 19 months. He also worked as a second unit director during the extensive reshoots.
All Rick Baker’s designs were cut and most of KNB practical effects were replaced by CGI, including Judy Greer’s transformation. Nevertheless, Rick Baker’s name was displayed in the opening credits as the sole special makeup effects designer and creator.

In the fall of 2004, Dimension Films cut the film to a PG-13 rating instead of the planned R rating. Speaking to the New York Post, Craven commented, "The contract called for us to make an R-rated film. We did. It was a very difficult process. Then it was basically taken away from us and cut to PG-13 and ruined. It was two years of very difficult work and almost 100 days of shooting of various versions. Then at the very end, it was chopped up and the studio thought they could make more with a PG-13 movie, and trashed it ... I thought it was completely disrespectful, and it hurt them too, and it was like they shot themselves in the foot with a shotgun." Jenny's death scene in the elevator was originally much gorier, her dead body shown with her belly ripped apart, although not even the R-rated DVD version included this scene. A picture of her mutilated body was, however, shown in a Fangoria article published before the film's release covering the infamously troubled production. Craven and Lussier would move on to Red Eye, and during that film's post-production they would learn that Cursed would be edited down to accommodate a PG-13 rating. A nightmare sequence featuring Jake's throat getting ripped out by Ellie was redone without Craven, instead with Joel Soisson serving as director. In 2008, Craven was quoted saying, "...the Cursed experience was so screwed up. I mean, that went on for two-and-a-half years of my life for a film that wasn't anything close to what it should have been. […] I did learn from the Cursed experience not to do something for money. They said, 'We know you want to do another film, we'll pay you double.' And we were 10 days from shooting, and I said fine. But I ended up working two-and-a-half years for double my fee, but I could have done two-and-a-half movies, and done movies that were out there making money. In general, I think it's not worth it and part of the reason my phone hasn't rung is that that story is pretty well known."

In July 2021, Brian Collins from Screamfest blog did a review and comparison between the final film and both the Craven's original unfinished cut and first reshot version, which were surfaced from VHS workprints, and both versions were praised as superior to the final film. This is not the first time when news about alternate versions of Cursed existing were reported. Some years ago when he was asked by fans about the film, Patrick Lussier mentioned how he still has copies of three unreleased versions of the film (Craven's unfinished cut, first reshot version, and fully uncut reshot version with all the deleted gore and practical effects by KNB from before most of their work was cut as well), and in October 2018, former Dimension COO Cary Blanat confirmed that all original and deleted footage from Cursed still exists.

Soundtrack

Release

Theatrical 
The original target release date was August 8, 2003, but delays in getting the production ready in time pushed the target date back six months to February 13, 2004. When the movie was sent back to development and three different reshoots were scheduled, the release date was pushed back again. In December 2004 Fangoria reported that the movie was scheduled to open nationwide February 25, 2005 with a PG-13 rating.

Christina Ricci’s face served as the backdrop in the movie’s key art, that evoked Drew Barrymore’s close-up in Scream’s iconic official poster. The tagline for the movie was “What doesn’t kill you makes you stronger”. The first official trailer premiered on January 7, 2005.

Home media 
When released on DVD in the US on June 21, 2005, two versions were available: the original theatrical version (rated PG-13; 97 minutes), and also an unrated version which contains the footage cut to obtain a PG-13 rating and runs approximately two minutes longer than the original release. The film received its Blu-ray release on September 11, 2012 through Echo Bridge Entertainment, in a double feature with another Wes Craven film, They (2002). The disc only contains the theatrical cut. The film was released individually for the first time in the United States on blu-ray by Shout Factory, featuring both the theatrical and extended cut, in April 2022.

In Canada, Alliance Atlantis released the unrated (marketed as "Uncensored") version only on DVD (as opposed to Dimension Home Video in the US) and the DVD cover was changed to match the original theatrical poster.

Reception

Box office
Cursed opened theatrically on February 25, 2005 in 2,805 theatres, taking $9,633,085 in its opening weekend and averaging a mild $3,434 per site. It placed fourth on the box office rankings, following Diary of a Mad Black Woman (opening that weekend as well), Hitch and Constantine. The following weekend, the movie crumbled 60%, grossing $3,867,052 and finishing seventh in the box office charts, with a 10-day sum of $15.3M. Box Office Guru dubbed the film’s performance as "disappointing”. On its third week, the film placed tenth, falling 60% to $1,564,363 for a $17.7 total, marking its last week in the national top ten. Box Office Guru predicted a final gross of about $21 million.

Cursed ended its theatrical run after 11 weeks on May 12, 2005, with a cumulative gross of $19,294,901.

Critical response
On Rotten Tomatoes the film holds an approval rating of 15% based on 98 reviews, with an average rating of 3.70/10. The site's critics consensus reads: "A predictable plot and cheesy special effects make Cursed a less-than-scary experience." Metacritic reports a weighted average score of 31 out of 100 based on 21 critics, indicating "generally unfavorable reviews". Audiences polled by CinemaScore gave the film an average grade of "C–" on an A+ to F scale.

The San Francisco Chronicle wrote, "Cursed is a third-rate effort, with a weak script, cheap-looking effects and no genuine frights." Film Threat stated, "Not that it doesn't make movie history. Until this past Friday, the worst werewolf film ever made was, hairy hands down, Mike Nichols' Wolf. Cursed now assumes that dubious distinction and someone is going to have to try very hard to wrestle it away."

Rafe Telsch of Cinema Blend, giving the film 2 out of 5 stars, felt that "Cursed isn't a bad film, and actually takes a unique approach to modern day genre movies by styling itself as an older one... The film is a fun little romp in the werewolf world, although Cursed never really sets any rules for the creatures themselves, leaving itself open to keep cute faces like Ricci's uncovered by makeup, but leaving the audience unsatisfied that there aren't really many werewolves in this werewolf movie."

#ReleaseTheCravenCut campaign
On October 30, 2018, former Dimension COO Cary Blanat revealed in an interview with Bloody Disgusting that the original footage still exists, which inspired Twitter users and the Sight & Sound podcast calling for Craven's cut using the hashtag #ReleaseTheCravenCut, with Bloody Disgusting and Youtuber Cody Leach calling it the most anticipated horror movie director's cut.

Editor Patrick Lussier commented on the movement in July 2021, stating that a release of the original cut of the film was very unlikely due to the ending never being shot, and also due to a lack of popularity, as opposed to a film like Zack Snyder's Justice League. Lussier claimed he had no idea who owned the rights to the film due to various Miramax properties reverting to other companies, leaving any future of an alternate cut in doubt.

References

External links

 
 
 
 

2005 films
2005 comedy horror films
2005 LGBT-related films
2000s monster movies
2000s teen comedy films
2000s teen horror films
American body horror films
American comedy horror films
American werewolf films
American teen comedy films
American teen horror films
American teen LGBT-related films
Dimension Films films
2000s English-language films
Films about curses
Films about siblings
Films directed by Wes Craven
Films scored by Marco Beltrami
Films set in Los Angeles
Films shot in Los Angeles
Films with screenplays by Kevin Williamson
Gay-related films
LGBT-related comedy films
LGBT-related horror films
2000s American films